Byron Q (born Byron Chan and also known as Byron Qiao) is an American filmmaker, director and writer. His film production company is known as "Beyond Cinema Productions." His debut feature film, Bang Bang (2011), which won a Special Jury Award for Best First Feature, Narrative, at the 2011 Los Angeles Asian Pacific Film Festival. The film also starred Thai Ngo, David Huynh, Jessika Van, Walter Wong, Yen Ly, Vanna Fut and Peter Chanhthavongsak. He has also Directed and Written a Web Series entitled "Hollywood Aliens," starring David Huynh, who also appeared in Bang Bang. He has directed and written a documentary about Bang Bang cast member Vanna Fut entitled Raskal Love. He has recently finished shooting a feature film set in Las Vegas entitled Las Vegas Story.

Background
Byron Q studied under renowned French New Wave Director Jean-Pierre Gorin at the University of California, San Diego. As a result, his style has been observed as a mix of urban themes with French New Wave style.

Films

Feature films
Bang Bang, his first feature film, was shot on-location in San Diego. The film won a Special Jury Prize for Best First Feature, Narrative, at the 2011 Los Angeles Asian Pacific Film Festival. The film has also screened at the Boston Asian American Independent Film Festival, the Philadelphia Asian American Film Festival, the San Diego Asian Film Festival, the San Francisco International Asian American Film Festival, the Regent Park Film Festival in Toronto, the Las Vegas Film Festival, and more. The film is available on Blu-ray, DVD and on iTunes, and was entirely self-distributed.

In 2013, he completed his second feature film titled "Las Vegas Story." Eric Roberts appears in the film, as does David Huynh from Bang Bang.

Web Series, Short Films & Music Videos
Byron Q directed a web series titled Hollywood Aliens along with co-director Kevin Boston, starring David Huynh.

He has also directed a number of short films, including The Dream (2007) and My Darling Jane (2007). Q has also directed several music videos for Mondega ("Stand My Ground"), Bambu ("Music for the People" featuring Mondega), Raashan Ahmad (music videos for the tracks "In Love with Wax" and "Give Thanks"), Kero One ("When the Sunshine Comes"), D.U.S.T. ("Forgive and Forget"), D.U.S.T. feat. Chali 2na ("Make Your Move"), Deuce Eclipse feat. D.U.S.T. ("Blackout") and has directed a behind-the-scenes video for the music video "Back Again" by Talib Kweli and Hi-Tek.

Documentaries
In 2013, Byron Q has also directed and produced a documentary titled Raskal Love about Vanna Fut, a Seattle-based break dancer who also appeared in Bang Bang. In addition to Fut, the film also stars David Huynh, Thai Ngo, Allen Theosky Rowe and Feodor Chin (as Vanna's father). The film premiered at the 2013 Los Angeles Asian Pacific Film Festival in the documentary competition and was nominated for a Grand Jury Award for Best Documentary.

References

External links 
 
Byron Q, David Huynh, Jessika Van Interview: Bang Bang
 
Beyond Cinema Productions
Byron Q on Tumblr
Gangster Dreams: Interview with Bang Bang Director Byron Q., Asia Pacific Arts
Steez360, Exclusive Interview: Filmmaker Byron Q

Living people
Film directors from California
Taiwanese film directors
University of California, San Diego alumni
American film directors of Taiwanese descent
Year of birth missing (living people)